Paramacera allyni, the Arizona pine satyr or pine satyr, is a butterfly of the family Nymphalidae. It is found in North America from the mountains in south-eastern Arizona to Mexico.

The wingspan is 35–48 mm. Adults have brown wings, with dark borders and unringed eyespots on the upperside. On the underside, there are dark irregular lines, a large eyespot at the tip of the forewing and six small eyespots on the hindwing. Adults are on wing from June to August in one generation per year.

References

Butterflies described in 1972
Euptychiina
Nymphalidae of South America